Timm Thaler may refer to:

Timm Thaler (novel), 1962 children's novel written by James Krüss
Timm Thaler (1979 TV series), starring Tommi Ohrner and Horst Frank, based on the 1962 novel
Timm Thaler (2002 TV series), animated television series based on the 1962 novel